Jellert Van Landschoot (born 27 August 1997) is a Belgian professional footballer who plays for Deinze in the Belgian First Division B.

Club career
Van Landschoot played youth football for Club Brugge, who sent him on loan to FC Eindhoven ahead of the 2017–18 season. He made his Eerste Divisie debut for on 18 August 2017 in a game against SC Telstar.

On 12 September 2020, it was announced that Van Landschoot had signed with Lierse Kempenzonen.

Van Landschoot signed a two-year contract with Helmond Sport in July 2021, after having played one season for Lierse Kempenzonen.

On 4 August 2022, Van Landschoot joined  Deinze in the Belgian First Division B, signing a two-year deal with an option for an additional season.

References

External links
 

 
1997 births
People from Maldegem
Living people
Belgian footballers
Belgium youth international footballers
FC Eindhoven players
Oud-Heverlee Leuven players
NEC Nijmegen players
Lierse Kempenzonen players
Helmond Sport players
K.M.S.K. Deinze players
Challenger Pro League players
Belgian expatriate footballers
Expatriate footballers in the Netherlands
Eerste Divisie players
Association football midfielders
Footballers from East Flanders